Mount Carrara is a mountain rising to  near the center of the Sky-Hi Nunataks in Palmer Land. It was named by the Advisory Committee on Antarctic Names after Paul E. Carrara, United States Geological Survey (USGS) geologist, a member of the USGS field party, 1977–78, which carried out geological reconnaissance mapping of the area between the Sky-Hi Nunataks and the Orville Coast. Carrara and two party members climbed the mountain in January 1978.

References
 

Mountains of Palmer Land